Silvio Rosabal Bianco (born 31 December 1963) is a Cuban rowing coxswain. He competed in the men's coxed pair event at the 1980 Summer Olympics.

References

1963 births
Living people
Cuban male rowers
Olympic rowers of Cuba
Rowers at the 1980 Summer Olympics
Place of birth missing (living people)
Coxswains (rowing)
Pan American Games medalists in rowing
Pan American Games bronze medalists for Cuba
Rowers at the 1979 Pan American Games
Medalists at the 1979 Pan American Games